State Route 317 (SR 317) a state highway extending from Chattanooga, Tennessee, through Ooltewah, Collegedale, Apison, and ending in Bradley County. State Route 317 is also known as Bonny Oaks Drive, Volkswagen Drive,  Apison Pike, Wesleyan Road, and Weatherley Switch Road SE; It was formerly known as Old Lee Highway. It dead ends into State Route 60 in Bradley County.  In Chattanooga, this road crosses State Route 58.

History
In between Chattanooga and Collegedale SR 317 formerly went along Old Lee Highway to Apison Pike. It has been since rerouted with the completion of the Volkswagen Drive exit on I-75. It now joins I-75 at exits 7 A and B and runs concurrently with I-75 to exit 9, where SR 317 turns along Volkswagen Drive to Apison Pike. 

TDOT is working to widen and improve the  Apison Pike section of SR 317, located between I-75 and SR 320 (East Brainerd Road) in four separate phases. Phase 1 consisted of constructing a new five-lane (including two-way left turn lane) road between I-75 and Old Lee Highway, part of the relocated section of SR 317. Phase 2, which took place between January 2015 and September 13, 2017, widened the segment between Old Lee Highway and SR 321 (Ooltewah-Ringgold Road) from two to five lanes at a cost of $24.2 million. Phase 3, which began on March 13, 2020 and is expected to be completed by June 2025, is the most complex and expensive phase, at a cost of $93.1 million. It involves widening the route from two to five lanes between SR 321 and Layton Lane, and will consist of an entirely new alignment in some places. Phase 4, the final phase, will widen SR 317 between Layton Lane and SR 320.

Places of interest along route
Enterprise South Industrial Park, formerly the Volunteer Army Ammunition Plant, home to the Volkswagen Chattanooga Assembly Plant.
US Xpress Enterprises Inc
McKee Foods Corporation
Southern Adventist University
Collegedale Municipal Airport

Counties traversed (west to east)
Hamilton
Bradley

Junction list

See also
List of Tennessee state highways

References

317